A river crossing is a means to get from one river bank to the other and may refer to:

 A ford (crossing)
 A bridge
 A tunnel
 Any type of ferry
 A cable ferry
 A reaction ferry
 A water taxi
 an overhead line crossing

See also
 River crossing puzzle
 Crossing the River, a 1993 historical fiction novel by Caryl Phillips
 Crossing (disambiguation)

Crossings by river